The Order of Carol I (Romanian: Ordinul Carol I) was the highest ranking of the Romanian honours of the Kingdom of Romania until the abolition of the monarchy in 1947. It was instituted on 10 May 1906 by King Carol I to celebrate the Ruby Jubilee of 40 years of his reign.

During its time as a national order, it was widely used to reward members of the Romanian royal family, Romanian Prime Ministers, Romanian politicians, foreign monarchs and heads of state, selected consorts and heirs, and other people thought to be worthy of receiving the order by the King of Romania.

It is currently a dynastic order of the former Romanian royal family. It is the highest-ranking award among all the decorations of the Romanian Royal House and is administered by its head. There are currently no foreign knights or dames of the order, except for members of the Romanian royal family.

Classes
The order has only the superior classes, each of them with limited numbers:
 Grand Cross with Collar (limited to 10)
 Grand Cross (limited to 20)
 Grand Officer (limited to 30)
 Commander (limited to 40)

Posseeders of the order, regardless of degree, call themselves Knight of the Order of Carol I.

Insignia

Collar
The Collar is in Gold and consists of 8 links of the emblems of the Danubian Principalities of The: Principality of Wallachia, Principality of Moldavia, Principality of Oltenia and Principality of Dobruja, 4 emblems on either side of the collar with 2 of the emblems of the House of Hohenzollern between each two Principalities; between each emblem is the monogram of King Carol I. At the back of the collar is the lock which is an Eagle with open wings which suspends in half to wear. At the front of the collar is the Steel Crown of Romania which the badge of the order suspends from.

Badge 
 The Badge is the Romanian Eagle on top of a square Gold sunray on top of a Red Maltese cross. The Eagle wears the Crown of Romania, holds the Orthodox cross in its beak, holds the Sword of King Carol I in its left claw, holds the Royal Mantle in its right claw and supports the ribbon inscribed "PRIN STATORNICIE LA IZBÂNDĂ" by both its claws whilst on its chest is a small Gold effigy of King Carol I.
On the obverse is the Red Maltese cross on top of the Gold sunray, in the middle of the Maltese Cross is a small Gold monogram of King Carol I.

 The Badge is featured on: The Collar, The Sash, The Medal and The Necklet.

Stars
There are two types of stars of the order: 1st which is for the Grand Cross with Collar/Grand Cross and the 2nd which is for the Grand Officer; both are to worn on the left stomach.

 The 1st Star is in Gold which is 8-pointed, set in sunray's and is similar in shape of the Swedish Royal Order of the Seraphim; the Eagle which is on the Badge is on top of the star and set in Silver.
 The 2nd Star is also in Gold and also in sunray's, it is set in a Rhombus shape and is similar in shape of the Dutch Order of the Crown; the Eagle which is on the Badge is on top of the star and set in Gold.

Sash
The Sash is pale Blue with Gold edges bearing a narrow Red stripe; at the bottom of the sash is a bow which joins both sides together and where the badge hangs from; It is worn from the right shoulder.

Recipients

Grand Cross with Collar
 Romanian royal family
 King Carol I of Romania
 Queen Elisabeth of Romania
 King Ferdinand I of Romania
 Queen Marie of Romania
 Prince Carol of Hohenzollern-Sigmaringen - revoked
 Prince Nicholas of Hohenzollern-Sigmaringen - revoked
 King Michael I of Romania
 Queen Anne of Romania
 Margareta, Custodian of the Crown of Romania

Romania
 Alexandru Averescu, 24th, 27th and 31st Prime Minister of Romania
 Ion C. Brătianu
 Petre P. Carp
 Gheorghe Grigore Cantacuzino, 20th & 23rd Prime Minister of Romania
 Nicolae Iorga, 34th Prime Minister of Romania
 Titu Maiorescu
 Gheorghe Manu, 17th Prime Minister of Romania
 Patriarch Miron of Romania, 38th Prime Minister of Romania and 7th Patriarch of All Romania
 Mihail Pherekyde
 Constantin Prezan, 28th and 25th Chief of the Romanian General Staff
 Dimitrie Sturdza
 Gheorghe Tătărescu, 36th and 42nd Prime Minister of Romania
 Nicolae Titulescu
 Alexandru Vaida-Voevod, 28th, 35th and 37th Prime Minister of Romania

Foreign
  Albanian Royal Family: Former King Zog I of Albania
 : Archduke Franz Ferdinand of Austria
 : Franz Joseph I of Austria
 : Frederick I, Grand Duke of Baden
 : Albert I of Belgium
 : Leopold II of Belgium
 : King Boris III of the Bulgarians
 : Ferdinand I of Bulgaria
 : Edvard Beneš, 2nd President of Czechoslovakia
 : Tomáš Garrigue Masaryk, 1st President of Czechoslovakia
 : Christian X of Denmark
 : Armand Fallières
 : Albert François Lebrun, 15th President of France
 : Raymond Poincaré
  German Imperial and Royal Family: Former Emperor Wilhelm II of Germany
  Kingdom of Greece: King Constantine I of Greece
  Kingdom of Greece: George I of Greece
  Kingdom of Greece: King George II of Greece
  Kingdom of Greece: King Paul I of Greece
  Kingdom of Italy: Victor Emmanuel III of Italy
 : Queen Wilhelmina of the Netherlands
 : King Haakon VII of Norway
  Ottoman Imperial Family: Former Emperor Abdul Hamid II of the Ottoman Empire, 33rd Ottoman Caliph
 : Ignacy Mościcki
 : Józef Piłsudski, Chief of State of Poland
 : Carlos I of Portugal
  Russian Imperial Family: Former Emperor Nicholas II of Russia
 : Alfonso XIII of Spain
 : Colin Robert Ballard, Brigadier of the British Army
 : Edward VII
 : George V
 : George VI
  Kingdom of Yugoslavia: King Alexander I of Yugoslavia
  Kingdom of Yugoslavia: Peter II of Yugoslavia

Grand Cross
 Romanian royal family
 Queen Mother Helen of Romania
 Prince Radu of Romania

Romania
 Constantin Angelescu
 Petre S. Aurelian
 Constantin Coandă
 Constantin Dissescu
 Nicolae Haralambie
 Take Ionescu
 Ioan Kalinderu
 Iuliu Maniu
 Gheorghe Mironescu
 Theodor Rosetti, 16th Prime Minister of Romania
 Anghel Saligny
 Fyodor Tolbukhin
 Artur Văitoianu

Foreign
 : Queen Elisabeth, Queen Grandmother of Belgium
 : Former King Leopold III of Belgium
 Germany
  German Imperial and Royal Family: Empress Augusta Victoria, Former Empress Consort of Germany
  Grand Ducal Family of Mecklenburg-Strelitz: Prince Georg Alexander, Hereditary Grand Duke of Mecklenburg-Strelitz
  Kingdom of Greece: Queen Sophia, Queen Mother of Greece
  Greek Royal Family: Queen Frederica, Queen Mother of Greece
  Italian Royal Family: Former King Umberto II of Italy
  Russian Imperial Family: Empress Alexandra Feodorovna, The Former Empress Consort of Russia
 : Prince Arsen of Yugoslavia
 : Nikola Pašić, Prime Minister of Serbia and Yugoslavia

Grand Officer
  Romanian royal family
 Princess Elisabeth of Romania
 Queen Maria, Queen Mother of Yugoslavia
 Princess Ileana of Romania
 Princess Elena of Romania

Romania
 Constantin C. Arion, 50th Minister of Foreign Affairs of Romania
 Emil Costinescu
 Nicolae Gane
 Spiru Haret
 Gheorghe I. Lahovary
 Iacob Lahovary
 Ioan Lahovary
 Alexandru Marghiloman
 Constantin Olănescu
 Petru Poni
 General Nicolae Samsonovici, 20th Chief of the Romanian General Staff

Commander
Romania
 Alecu Beldiman
 Constantin Cantacuzino-Pașcanu
 Alexandru C. Constantinescu
 Nicolae Filipescu
 Grigore I Ghica
 Dimitrie I. Ghika
 Constantin Hârjeu
 Vasile Morțun
 Mihail Orleanu
 Ermil Pangrati
 Alexandru Plagino
 Grigore Tocilescu
 Scarlat Vârnav

See also
 Romanian Royal Family
 Decorations of the Romanian Royal House

References

External links
 Orders and Decorations of the Romanian Royal Family

House of Romania
Carol I, Order of
Awards established in 1906